Lake View Cemetery is a cemetery in the city of Jamestown, in Chautauqua County, New York.

History
The cemetery was established in 1859 after two prior cemeteries had been established in Jamestown, New York. THe cemetery is located on 37.5 acres and contains more than 43,000 burials.

The Fenton History Center hosts the annual Saints and Sinners Cemetery Tours in the cemetery.

Notable burials
 Edith Ainge (1873–1948), American suffragist
 Lucille Ball (1911–1989), American comedian and actress
 Henri Le Fevre Brown (1845–1910), Civil War soldier and Medal of Honor recipient
 Samuel A. Carlson (1868–1961), 7th & 9th Mayor of Jamestown, New York
 Reuben Fenton (1819–1885), 22nd Governor of New York (1865–1868) and U.S. Senator from New York (1869–1875)
 Elial T. Foote (1796–1877), New York State Assemblyman and Chautauqua County Judge
 Charles Goodell (1926–1987), U.S. Congressman (1959–1968) and U.S. Senator from New York (1968–1971)
 Benjamin Goodrich (1841–1888), American industrialist and founder of the B.F. Goodrich Company
 Chapin Hall (1816–1879), U.S. Congressman (1859–1861)
 Abner Hazeltine (1793–1879), U.S. Congressman (1833–1837)
 Richard P. Marvin (1803–1892), U.S. Congressman (1837–1941)
 James Prendergast (1764–1846), founder of Jamestown, New York
 Edgar Pierpont Putnam (1844–1921), Civil War soldier and Medal of Honor recipient
 Porter Sheldon (1831–1908), U.S. Congressman (1869–1871)
 James Marvin Young (1843–1913), Civil War Soldier and Medal of Honor recipient

References

1859 establishments in New York (state)
Cemeteries in Chautauqua County, New York